Cities are ordered by their position on the Mediterranean, from west to east. They can be reordered by name (alphabetically), country, subdivision of the Mediterranean, population size, or main language spoken in the city.

References

See also
List of Mediterranean countries

Coastal settlements
Mediterranean Sea